The Kentucky Public Service Commission is the public utilities commission for the State of Kentucky.

The commission is a quasi-judicial regulatory tribunal. It regulates the intrastate rates and services of investor-owned electric, natural gas, telephone, water and sewage utilities, customer-owned electric and telephone cooperatives, water districts and associations, and certain aspects of gas pipelines in the state.

External links
 Kentucky Public Service Commission Website

Kentucky
Public Service Commission